Ursula Selle (born 18 June 1933) is a Venezuelan fencer. She competed in the women's individual foil event at the 1952 Summer Olympics.

References

External links
 

1933 births
Living people
Venezuelan female foil fencers
Olympic fencers of Venezuela
Fencers at the 1952 Summer Olympics